Four Embarcadero Center is a class-A office skyscraper in the Financial District of San Francisco, California. The building is part of the Embarcadero Center complex of six interconnected buildings and one off-site extension. The skyscraper, completed in 1982, stands  with 45 stories. Four Embarcadero Center is the tallest building out of the entire complex, standing at slightly taller than One Embarcadero Center, which is the second tallest in the complex without its flagpole.

History
As of 2021, the complex is owned by Boston Properties. In 1998, they purchased the four towers along with 275 Battery street and the old Federal Reserve building from Prudential and David Rockefeller for US$1.22 billion.

See also

List of tallest buildings in San Francisco

References

External links
Embarcadero Center official website

Financial District, San Francisco
John C. Portman Jr. buildings
Skyscraper office buildings in San Francisco
Twin towers
1982 establishments in California
Office buildings completed in 1982